A berceuse  is "a musical composition usually in  time that resembles a lullaby". Otherwise it is typically in triple meter. Tonally most berceuses are simple, often merely alternating tonic and dominant harmonies; since the intended effect is to put a baby to sleep, wild chromaticism would be somewhat inappropriate. Another characteristic of the berceuse, for no reason other than convention, is a tendency to stay on the "flat side"; noted examples including the berceuses by Chopin, who pioneered the form, Liszt, and Balakirev, which are all in D.

Music 
 Berceuse pour deux notes qui cornent (for two notes which continue), for organ, JA 7, by Jehan Alain
 Wiegenlied (Brahms), a cradle song, is a berceuse; it is better known in English as Brahms's Lullaby
 Berceuse, by Frank Bridge, for cello and piano
 Compositions by Ferruccio Busoni
Berceuse (in C major) Op. 2, for piano
Berceuse (Lullaby), for piano
Berceuse élégiaque
 Berceuse, for piano by Frédéric Chopin
 "Berceuse for the Infant Jesu" in A Little Suite for Christmas, by George Crumb
 Berceuse Heroique, for piano, by Claude Debussy
Two compositions by Gabriel Fauré
 Berceuse, Op. 16.
 "Berceuse" section of Dolly Suite for Piano four-hands, Op. 56, No. 1, by Fauré. Sometimes transcribed for violin and piano: not to be confused with the Op. 16 work, above.
 Berceuse for an Unwanted Child (Reginald Foresythe) 1934
 Berceuse de Jocelyn, a lullaby from the opera "Jocelyn" by Benjamin Godard
 Berceuse de Jupiter, also known as the aria "Que Les Songes Heureux" from the opera "Philémon et Baucis", by Charles Gounod
 Grieg Lyric Pieces Op. 38 No. 1
 "Berceuse" from 114 Songs (1922) by Charles Ives
 Berceuse by Armas Järnefelt 1904
 "Berceuse" from 12 Transcendental Études by Sergei Lyapunov
 Berceuse sur le nom de Gabriel Fauré by Maurice Ravel for violin and piano
 "Berceuse" in Six pieces for violin and piano, Op 79, No. 6, by Jean Sibelius
 One of the excerpts from The Firebird, a ballet by Igor Stravinsky
 Berceuse for Solo Piano in A flat Major, Op. 72, No. 2, by Tchaikovsky
 Berceuse (sur les paroles classiques), from 24 Pieces in Free Style, for organ, by Louis Vierne
 Berceuse for Mallory, a big band jazz composition by Steve Spiegl
 French online radio station titled berceuses.com with lullabies for children

Art

La Berceuse, a series of paintings by Vincent van Gogh

References 

Musical forms
Lullabies